Gavin Moynihan (born 17 September 1994) is an Irish professional golfer who plays on the European Tour. Partnered with Paul Dunne, they won the 2018 GolfSixes.

Amateur career
Moynihan had a successful amateur career winning the Irish Amateur Open Championship in 2012 and 2015 and twice playing in the Walker Cup. He attended the University of Alabama from 2013 but left during his sophomore year.

Professional career
Moynihan turned professional immediately after the 2015 Walker Cup, making his professional debut in the 2015 Italian Open. During 2016 he made the cut in the Irish Open and tied for third in the Open La Pinetina on the Alps Tour. He had his first professional win in April 2017 when he won the Lookers Championship on the PGA EuroPro Tour. The next month he was runner-up in the Andalucía Costa del Sol Match Play 9, on the Challenge Tour, losing 2&1 to Aaron Rai in the final. He finished the season in 18th place in the Challenge Tour Order of Merit and then earned a 2018 European Tour card through Q School after finishing tied for 25th place in the 6-round final stage.

Moynihan had a poor start to 2018, although, partnered with Paul Dunne, they won the GolfSixes in early May. It was not until the SSE Scottish Hydro Challenge, towards the end of June, that he made the cut in an individual event. He had a number of better finishes towards the end of the year, including a tie for 8th place in the Andalucía Valderrama Masters, and the season ended successfully when he earned a 2019 European Tour card through Q School after finishing tied for 20th place in the 6-round final stage. He qualified by one stroke for a second year running by sinking a five foot putt on the 18th hole at Lumine Golf Club in Tarragona.

Moynihan started his 2019 European Tour schedule at the AfrAsia Bank Mauritius Open and had a solid 11th place finish. On 3 March 2019, Moynihan finished in a tied 12th position at the Oman Open

Amateur wins
2012 Peter McEvoy Trophy, Irish Amateur Open Championship
2013 Carrick Neill Scottish Open Championship
2015 Irish Amateur Open Championship

Professional wins (2)

PGA EuroPro Tour wins (1)

Other wins (1)

Team appearances
Amateur
European Boys' Team Championship (representing Ireland): 2011, 2012
Jacques Léglise Trophy (representing Great Britain & Ireland): 2011 (winners), 2012 (captain)
Junior Ryder Cup (representing Europe): 2012
Eisenhower Trophy (representing Ireland): 2012, 2014
European Amateur Team Championship (representing Ireland): 2013, 2014, 2015
Walker Cup (representing Great Britain & Ireland): 2013, 2015 (winners)
Bonallack Trophy (representing Europe): 2014 (winners)

See also
2017 European Tour Qualifying School graduates
2018 European Tour Qualifying School graduates

References

External links

Irish male golfers
Alabama Crimson Tide men's golfers
European Tour golfers
Sportspeople from Dublin (city)
1994 births
Living people